Lei Ka Him (born 16 August 1991) is a Macanese international footballer who plays as a defender for C.P.K. and the Macau national football team.

Club career
Lei has represented numerous clubs in Macau, and has consistently played in the Liga de Elite since 2010.

International career
Lei made his international debut in 2010, replacing Mok Tsa Yeung in the 60th minute of a 7-1 defeat to Chinese Taipei. He scored his first goal against the same opponent; this time a 3-2 defeat in 2016.

Career statistics

Club

Notes

International

References

External links
 
 

1991 births
Living people
Macau footballers
Macau international footballers
Association football defenders